KDNI, known on-air as Faith 90.5 FM, or by the network name Faith Radio, is a radio station in Duluth, Minnesota, owned and operated by University of Northwestern - St Paul and is a non-profit, listener-supported radio station relying on donations from the local community throughout the year. It broadcasts on 90.5 FM, covering Duluth-Superior and surrounding areas in Minnesota and Wisconsin.

Programming is nearly 100 percent satellite delivered and produced by Northwestern Media.

The format is mainly Christian talk and teaching, with programs such as Turning Point with David Jeremiah; Focus on the Family; Family Life Today with Dennis Rainey; Insight for Living with Chuck Swindoll; Living on the Edge with Chip Ingram; In Touch with Charles Stanley; Walk in the Word with James McDonald; Just Thinking with Ravi Zacharias; and others.

References

Translators

External links

KDNI
Northwestern Media
Christian radio stations in Minnesota